Burden of Proof is an extended play album that was released by Bob Schneider on June 11, 2013.

Track listing
"Digging for Icicles" – 3:42
"Wish the Wind Would Blow Me" – 3:05
"Hop on the World" – 3:47
"Swimming in the Sea" – 3:30
"Unpromised Land" – 2:57
"Best Day Ever" – 3:19
"The Effect" – 1:57
"Please Ask for Help" – 2:44
"Weed Out the Weak" – 2:41
"John Lennon" – 4:21
"The White Moon" – 2:54
"Tomorrow" – 1:52

Bob Schneider albums
2013 EPs